Everdell is a board game for 1 to 4 players designed by James Wilson and published by Starling Games in 2018. In the game, players take the role of forest animals building a city over four seasons by collecting resources, recruiting workers, and constructing buildings. The game has been well regarded by reviewers, with its art and components receiving strong praise.

Gameplay

Over four seasons, players place their forest animal meeples to get resources to buy cards into a personal tableau, which give points towards winning the game or special abilities to help them build further. The game starts simply, with the complexity increasing as a player's cards gain synergies from newly acquired cards. In addition to the points they get from acquiring cards, players score by triggering events, from collecting certain combinations of card types, and from end game bonuses given by cards for acquiring certain other cards in their city.

Reception

Keith Law of Paste Magazine and Vulture dubbed Everdell one of the best new board games of 2018, praising its gameplay, forest animal theme, and "gorgeous" art and components. Smithsonian also called it one of the best games of 2018, lavishing praise on the tactile components, such as the hefty coins, squishy berries, and three dimensional tree which holds the cards available for purchase.

Everdell was nominated for a Golden Geek award for Best Artwork and Presentation.

Expansions

Starling Games have ran several successful Kickstarter campaigns to fund expansions for the game.

The first expansion Pearlbrook released in 2019 after being funded via Kickstarter in September 2018. The expansion gives players frog ambassadors who can collect pearls and trade with undersea creatures. 

Two more expansions were funded by another Kickstarter in September 2019. Spirecrest adds a new Mountain board that players can explore in addition to various new card types. Bellfaire adds several modules to the game including unique player powers, a new market location and rules to support 5-6 players.

A third kickstarter in September 2021 funded two more expansions. Newleaf adds a new station board and several train-themed components. Mistwood adds a new gamemode designed for solo or two player games. A version of the game titled Everdell: The Complete Collection containing all 5 expansions was also funded during this Kickstarter. The expansions and Complete Collection are planned for release in 2023.

A simplified version of the base game aimed at a younger audience called My Lil' Everdell was published in 2022.

Digital edition 
A video game adaptation developed by Dire Wolf was released in July 2022 on Steam, iOS and Android. A Nintendo Switch version was released in September 2022.

References

External links 
Everdell at Starling Games

Board games
Kickstarter-funded tabletop games
Board games introduced in 2018